Köhnəqala (also, Kegna-Kala) is a village and municipality in the Tovuz Rayon of Azerbaijan.  It has a population of 1,589.

References 

Populated places in Tovuz District